St. John's Episcopal Church, also known as St John's in the Village, is a nineteenth-century Episcopal church building on Old York Road (off Greenmount Avenue and 31st Street) in the former village of Huntingdon (now the community of Waverly in northeast Baltimore, Maryland, United States. The congregation is often referred to as "St. John's of Huntingdon Episcopal Church". It is a Gothic Revival structure built originally in 1847. Also on the property is a cemetery.

All Time Low had their first show ever here in 2003.

St. John's Protestant Episcopal Church was listed on the National Register of Historic Places in 1974.

References

External links

, including undated photo, at Maryland Historical Trust
Saint John's in the Village website
 Saint John’s in the Village – Explore Baltimore Heritage

Better Waverly, Baltimore
Episcopal church building in Baltimore
Episcopal church buildings in Maryland
Churches on the National Register of Historic Places in Maryland
Churches completed in 1849
19th-century Episcopal church buildings
Gothic Revival church buildings in Maryland
1843 establishments in Maryland
Properties of religious function on the National Register of Historic Places in Baltimore
Baltimore City Landmarks